Blind Justice is a 1994 historical mystery novel by Bruce Alexander. It is Alexander's first novel about Sir John Fielding, organizer of London's first police force

Plot summary
Young Jeremy Proctor, recently orphaned, is taken in as ward by blind Sir John Fielding, Magistrate of the Bow Street court and organizer of London's first police force.  When Sir John investigates the apparent suicide of Lord Goodhope, it is Jeremy's eyes which note the crucial clue.

1994 American novels
Sir John Fielding series
American crime novels
American historical novels
Novels about orphans
Novels set in London
Historical crime novels
Historical mystery novels
Novels set in the 18th century
G. P. Putnam's Sons books